Events in the year 1927 in China.

Incumbents
President of the Republic of China:
 V. K. Wellington Koo(署理) ( 1 October 1926 – 16 June 1927 )
Premier of the Republic of China: 
 V. K. Wellington Koo ( 1 October 1926 – 16 June 1927 )
 Pan Fu ( 18 June 1927 – 2 June 1928 )

Events

March
21–27 March – Nanking Incident

April
 3 April – Hankou Incident
 12 April – Shanghai massacre
 15 April – Whampoa Military Academy purge

May
 22 May – 1927 Gulang earthquake

July
 15 July – Wuhan coup

August
 1 August – Nanchang uprising
 28–31 August – The Far Eastern Championship Games take place in Shanghai.

September
 30 September – Start of Battle of Shantou

October
 1 October – End of Battle of Shantou

December
 1 December – Marriage of Chiang Kai-shek and Soong Mei-ling in Shanghai.

Births
 5 March – Wang You-theng
 18 March – Chang Jen-hu, Taiwanese geographer (d. 2019)
 28 March – Chin Kung
 19 August – Hsing Yun
 22 August – Ye Zhengda, Chinese politician and engineer (d. 2017)
 Fan Wanzhang
 26 December – Lin Hu, Chinese general (d. 2018)

Deaths
 31 March – Kang Youwei
 28 April – Li Dazhao
 23 May – Tang Jiyao
 2 June – Wang Guowei
 19 July – Zhao Shiyan
 11 November – Wang Hebo
 12 December – Zhang Tailei

References

 
1920s in China
Years of the 20th century in China